SS Michael E was a  cargo ship that was built in 1941. She was the first British Catapult Aircraft Merchant ship: a merchant ship fitted with a rocket catapult to launch a single Hawker Hurricane fighter to defend a convoy against long-range German bombers. She was sunk on her maiden voyage by a German submarine.

Description
Michael E was built by William Hamilton & Co Ltd, Port Glasgow. Launched in 1941, she was completed in May of that year. She was the United Kingdom's first CAM ship, armed with an aircraft catapult on her bow to launch a Hawker Sea Hurricane.

The engine was built by David Rowan & Co Ltd, Glasgow.

History
Michael E was owned by the Bury Hill Shipping Co Ltd. a company owned by the Nicholas Eustathiou shipping concerns. She was placed under the management of Counties Ship Management Ltd of London, an offshoot of the Rethymnis & Kulukundis shipbroking company. She was named after Michael Eustathiou, a member of the Nicholas Eustathiou family that had a major shareholding in her. Her Code Letters were BCKB, her UK Official Number was 163168 and she was registered in London.

Sinking
On 28 May 1941 Michael E sailed in ballast on her maiden voyage from Belfast, Northern Ireland bound for Halifax, Nova Scotia with convoy OB 327. The convoy was dispersed on 1 June and at 20:43 hours on 2 June Michael E was in the North Atlantic several hundred miles southwest of Cape Clear when  fired two torpedoes at her. One missed but the other struck her in the stern killing a crew member and two DEMS gunners, and at 22:21 hours she sank by the stern. On 3 June the Dutch cargo ship  rescued Michael E'''s Master, 44 crew, two gunners and 12 RAF personnel.

Replacement ship
In September 1941 William Hamilton & Co completed a second CAM ship of the same class for CSM.

References

Sources & further reading

1941 ships
CAM ships
Ships built on the River Clyde
Maritime incidents in June 1941
Ships of Counties Ship Management
Ships sunk by German submarines in World War II
Steamships of the United Kingdom
World War II shipwrecks in the Atlantic Ocean
World War II merchant ships of the United Kingdom